Kresson (formerly known as Milford) is an unincorporated community located within Voorhees Township, in Camden County, New Jersey, United States. The community was named for George Kress, who ran a local general store. Kresson Golf Course is a public golf course located in the area, near Route 73 and Kresson Lake.

In the area of Kresson is Kresson Elementary School, one of four elementary schools in the township. Kresson has over 300 students.

References

Neighborhoods in Camden County, New Jersey
Unincorporated communities in Camden County, New Jersey
Unincorporated communities in New Jersey
Voorhees Township, New Jersey